William Nanda Bissell (born 10 June 1966) an Indian businessman and the chairman of Fabindia. Until 2018, Bissell served as the managing director of the company.

Early life and education

Bissell was born to Bimla Nanda, a Punjabi, and John Bissell, an American from Connecticut, who came to India in the 1950s as part of a programme by Ford Foundation to work with rural craftsmen and develop artisanal clusters in a newly independent nation. In 1960, John Bissell founded Fabindia, a company that connected rural craftsmen, weavers and artists from across India to urban markets.

Bissell grew up in Delhi and later attended Wesleyan University in the United States. After graduating in 1988, Bissell set up an artisans' co-operative based on the Gandhian model, which involved working with leather workers in Rajasthan. In 1993, Bissell returned to New Delhi to help John run Fabindia.

Work

Bissell acquired Organic India. He has also served as a trustee of Centre for Science and Environment in Delhi.

In 2009, he authored Making India Work, published by Penguin India, in which he drew from the experience of working with over 40,000 rural craftspeople in India and addressed India's economical and socio-political challenges.

Investing

Bissell is an angel investor and has made numerous investments across sectors, some of which include, the publishing platform Juggernaut Books, Wow! Momo, educational and school software startup Foradian.

References 

Wesleyan University alumni
Indian chief executives
20th-century Indian businesspeople
21st-century Indian businesspeople
Indian venture capitalists
Angel investors
Indian non-fiction writers
1966 births
Living people
Businesspeople from Punjab, India
Punjabi people
Indian people of American descent
People from New Delhi